Carolina School Supply Company Building is a historic warehouse building located at Charlotte, Mecklenburg County, North Carolina. It was built in 1927, and is a three-story, heavy timber mill construction building with brick veneer and restrained Gothic Revival style detailing.  The building has banks of steel sash windows and a flat roof.

It was added to the National Register of Historic Places in 2001.

References

Commercial buildings on the National Register of Historic Places in North Carolina
Gothic Revival architecture in North Carolina
Commercial buildings completed in 1927
Buildings and structures in Charlotte, North Carolina
National Register of Historic Places in Mecklenburg County, North Carolina